Ji Xiang (born 1 March 1990) is a Chinese professional footballer who currently plays as a right winger or right-back for Chinese Super League club Shandong Taishan.

Club career
Ji Xiang started his professional football career with Jiangsu Suning in the 2008 season when he was promoted to their senior team. He would go on to make his debut on October 18, 2008 in a league game against Qingdao Hailifeng F.C. in a 2-0 victory where he came on as a substitute. At the end of the league season Ji Xiang would go on to be part of the squad that won the division title and promotion to the top tier of Chinese football. In the top tier the Jiangsu manager, Pei Encai was initially reluctant to use Ji Xiang, however by the 2010 league season he showed more faith in him, which saw Ji Xiang repay him by scoring his first goal for the club on August 22, 2010 against Qingdao Jonoon F.C. in a 4-0 victory. 

By the following season he would establish himself as a regular within the team despite Pei Encai leaving and in the 2012 season, Ji broke the record for the fastest goal in Chinese Super League history, scoring a goal timed at 7 seconds in a 1-1 draw against Guangzhou Evergrande on October 20, 2012. Now an establish integral part of the team he would go on to win the 2015 Chinese FA Cup against Shanghai Shenhua. This would be followed by the 2020 Chinese Super League title when he would win the clubs first league title with them. On 28 February 2021, the parent company of the club Suning Holdings Group announced that operations were going to cease immediately due to financial difficulties.

On 23 March 2021 he would join top tier club Shandong Taishan on a free transfer. He made his debut for the club on 20 April 2021 in a league game against Chongqing Liangjiang Athletic that ended in a 2-0 victory. He would immediately establish himself as an integral member of the team that went on to the win the 2021 Chinese Super League title and 2021 Chinese FA Cup. This would be followed up by him winning the 2022 Chinese FA Cup with them the next season.

International career
Ji made his debut for the Chinese national team on 13 December 2014 in a 4-0 win against Kyrgyzstan. However, this match was not recognised as an international "A" match by FIFA. He finally made his official debut on 21 December 2014 in a 0-0 draw against Palestine.

Career statistics

Club statistics
.

International statistics

International goals

Scores and results list China's goal tally first.

Honours

Club
Jiangsu Suning
Chinese Super League: 2020
China League One: 2008
Chinese FA Super Cup: 2013
Chinese FA Cup: 2015

Shandong Taishan
 Chinese Super League: 2021
 Chinese FA Cup: 2021, 2022

References

External links
 
 

1990 births
Living people
Chinese footballers
Sportspeople from Yangzhou
Footballers from Jiangsu
Jiangsu F.C. players
China League One players
Chinese Super League players
China international footballers
2015 AFC Asian Cup players
Association football defenders